Allentown Presbyterian Cemetery (also known as Presbyterian Churchyard) is a cemetery located in Allentown, in Monmouth County, New Jersey, United States.

Noted interments 
 James Henderson Imlay (1764–1823), a U.S. Representative from March 4, 1797 to March 3, 1801, from New Jersey's at-large congressional district (1797–99) and New Jersey's 4th congressional district (1799–1801).
 William Augustus Newell (1817–1901), physician and politician, who was a three-term member of the United States House of Representatives, served as a Republican as the 18th Governor of New Jersey, and as Governor of the Washington Territory from 1880–84.

External links
 Presbyterian Cemetery interment information from The Political Graveyard
 
 

Cemeteries in Monmouth County, New Jersey
Protestant Reformed cemeteries
Allentown, New Jersey